Periodic elections for the Tasmanian Legislative Council were held on 7 May 2016. The two seats up for election were the electoral division of Apsley and the electoral division of Elwick. They were previously contested in 2010.

Apsley
The north-eastern Tasmanian division of Apsley has been held by independent member Tania Rattray since 2004. She was the sole nominee in the 2010 election and was declared re-elected unopposed.

In the 2016 election, Rattray faced competition from Darren Clark (Labor Party), CEO of the Tasmanian Association of Police and Community Youth Clubs; Brett Hall (Independent), a farmer; and Sophie Haughton (Tasmanian Greens).

|- style="background-color:#E9E9E9"
! colspan="6" align="left"|After transfer of Houghton's votes

Elwick
The Hobart division of Elwick was held by Adriana Taylor, who won the seat at the 2010 election.

In the 2016 election, Taylor faced competition from Penelope Ann (Tasmanian Greens), a tourism manager; and Josh Willie (Labor Party), a teacher.

Labor's Josh Willie won the seat, defeating incumbent independent Adriana Taylor.

References

External links
Tasmanian Electoral Commission website

2016 elections in Australia
Elections in Tasmania
2010s in Tasmania
May 2016 events in Australia